Fredrik Haugen (born 13 June 1992) is a Norwegian footballer playing for Eliteserien side Stabæk.

Club career

Løv-Ham
On 4 December 2008, a 16-year-old Haugen signed a professional contract with Løv-Ham. Upon the signing, Løv-Ham manager Trond Amundsen described Haugen as "a central midfielder...[who] has a very smart footballing head, and extreme skills to create and pass." He made his professional debut on 26 April 2009 as a late substitution against Sogndal. In his second appearance, Haugen, despite coming on as an 80th minute substitution, scored Løv-Ham's third goal in a 4-1 win over Sarpsborg 08. On 18 June 2009, Løv-Ham beat Start in a penalty shoot-out which finished 14-13 in the Norwegian Cup - Haugen showed calmness to score two penalties in the shoot-out. As the season progressed, he began to start with regularity, amounting thirteen starts in 2009, mostly between June and August. Throughout the autumn, Haugen spent most of his time training with Brann.

In August 2021, Haugen signed a short-term deal with Stabæk.

On 31 March 2022, Haugen joined Aalesund on a one-year deal.

Career statistics

Club

Honours

Individual
Eliteserien Top assist provider: 2017

References

External links
brann.no profile 
fotball.no profile 

1992 births
Living people
Norwegian footballers
Association football midfielders
Løv-Ham Fotball players
SK Brann players
AEK Larnaca FC players
Stabæk Fotball players
Aalesunds FK players
Norwegian First Division players
Eliteserien players
Cypriot First Division players
Norwegian expatriate footballers
Expatriate footballers in Cyprus
Norwegian expatriate sportspeople in Cyprus
Footballers from Bergen